The pale-bellied tyrant-manakin (Neopelma pallescens), or pale-bellied neopelma, is a species of bird in the family Pipridae.

Distribution and habitat
It is found in Brazil and far northeastern Bolivia.  Its natural habitats are subtropical or tropical dry forest, subtropical or tropical moist lowland forest, and subtropical or tropical dry shrubland.

References

pale-bellied tyrant-manakin
Birds of Brazil
Birds of the Caatinga
Birds of the Cerrado
pale-bellied tyrant-manakin
Taxonomy articles created by Polbot